Cambridge City Football Club is a football club based in Cambridgeshire, England who currently play in the . Formed in 1908 as Cambridge Town F.C. in Cambridge, they played their home games at the City Ground, Cambridge, between 1922 and 2013, and changed their name in 1951 when Cambridge was granted city status. Since 2013 they have been without a permanent home ground, groundsharing at Histon's Bridge Road (2013–15, 2018–present), and St Ives Town's Westwood Road, while a new ground at Sawston is being built, scheduled to open in August 2023.

Their home colours are white and black, and their nickname is ‘The Lilywhites’. Club honours include the Challenge International du Nord in 1912, and Southern League champions 1962–63.

History
The club was founded in 1908 as Cambridge Town F.C., as Cambridge had not been granted city status at that point, and were committed to amateur sport. The club competed in the Southern Amateur League, developing a fierce rivalry with Ipswich Town that was evident both on and off the pitch.
In 1912 they won the Challenge International du Nord in 1912, beating US Tourquennoise 4-1. The club were invited to join the newly formed Eastern Counties League in 1935, but declined the invitation and switched instead to the Spartan League.

The resumption of football after the Second World War saw Cambridge Town continuing in the Spartan League, winning the competition 3 times between 1945 and 1950, before joining the Athenian League for the 1950–51 season. Cambridge was formally granted city status in 1951. Both Cambridge Town and their neighbours Abbey United applied to change their name to Cambridge City. Cambridge Town's application was approved because it arrived first and therefore Abbey United changed their name to Cambridge United In 1958, 22 years after turning down the chance to apply to the Football League, Cambridge City joined the Southern League South Eastern zone as a professional club. The club went on to make five applications to join the Football League between 1959 and 1974, all of which were unsuccessful.

In the late 1950s and 1960s Cambridge City commanded the highest attendances in non-league football, regularly attracting average gates in excess of 3,500 (higher than rivals United during that period) and occasionally attracting gates over 10,000.  They were Southern League Champions in 1962–63 and stayed in the League's top division until 1968, when they were relegated and turned semi-professional. They were promoted back to the Premier Division after finishing in the Division One runners-up spot in 1969–70, and finished second in their first season back in the Premier Division.

Cambridge United were elected into the Football League in 1970, and from that point City struggled to attract as many supporters to their games as their cross-city rivals – by the early 1980s, when United were enjoying a prolonged spell in the 2nd Division, City were attracting fewer than 200 supporters to each game. 1975–76 saw the second relegation in the club's history, into the Southern League's Division One North. They remained there until 1979–80, when a re-organisation of the league's structure, in order to become a feeder to the newly formed Football Conference, placed City in the Midland Division. A switch was made to the Southern Division in the 1982–83 season and this seemed to coincide with a turn around in City's fortunes, and 1985–86 saw City win the division on goal difference and gain promotion back to the Premier Division.  The late 1980's through to the early 90's saw City competing at the top of the Premier Division.

City suffered a last day relegation at Atherstone United in May 1996, only to be reprieved.  After a few seasons struggling at the wrong end of the table, including another reprieve from relegation in 1999, City's league form improved at just the right time and the club joined the Football Conference's newly formed South Division in 2004–05, embarking on a successful FA Cup run in the same season – following United's relegation from the League in 2005, the two Cambridge clubs were only one division apart. However, the club was encountering financial difficulties and the club's City Ground was sold to an Isle of Man company called Ross River, which was linked to Brian York, a man who had briefly been a director of the club. The then board announced that it was to scrap the first team and make the reserve team into a feeder for Cambridge United. This prompted the formation of a supporters' trust, who within weeks had taken over the running of the club. The club took Ross River to court, where it was ruled that the club were victims of fraudulent misrepresentation and bribery – the former chief executive Arthur Eastham having taken a £10,000 payment from Brian York. though the original deal was not overturned.

In May 2008 City were demoted from the Conference South, after their ground failed an FA inspection, to the Southern League Premier Division for the 2008–09 season. They were moved into the Isthmian League Division One North for 2019-20, before switching to the Northern Premier League Midlands Division for the start of the 2021/22 season, where they continue to be members.

Colours and badge
Cambridge City have traditionally played in white shirts, leading to the club being nicknamed "The Lilywhites", they currently play in white shirts, black shorts and black socks. Their current away strip is sky blue shirts, sky blue shorts and sky blue socks.

The club uses the City of Cambridge’s coat of arms as a badge. It features a fortified bridge over a river.

Stadium

The City Ground (also known as "Milton Road"), was Cambridge City's home ground from 29 April 1922 until 27 April 2013, located in the Chesterton area of the city, approximately 0.62 miles (1 km) north of the city centre. The original ground was one of the largest outside the football league and was estimated to have a capacity in excess of 16,000, although the highest recorded attendance was 12,058 against Leytonstone on 11 February 1950. In the mid 1980s, part of the land the original ground stood on was sold for redevelopment, with a new ground built on the remaining land. The capacity of the second ground was approximately 3,000 with 700 seats.

The club was in a legal dispute with their landlords over the ground, which was sold by a previous board of directors for less than its market value. The High Court ruled that the club had been fraudulently misrepresented, and the club will receive 50% of the development profits on the site.

In February 2010, Cambridge City announced a three-year ground-share with Newmarket Town at their Cricket Field Road ground in Newmarket, approximately 13 miles away, for the 2010–2011 season. The ground was deemed to need work to bring it up to the required standard, and Cambridge City were to use this time to seek a permanent home closer to Cambridge. The groundshare was later deferred several times, and in April 2013, it was announced that the club had agreed a 2-year groundshare with neighbours Histon, with City sharing Bridge Road from the beginning of the 2013–14 season.  From 2015-18 they groundshared with St Ives Town, at their Westwood Road stadium, before reviving their share with Histon at the start of the 2018-19 season.

Future plans
In 2012, it was announced that the club's President, Len Satchell, had purchased 35 acres of land in Sawston, a village 9 kilometres/ 6 miles south of Cambridge, with a view to building the club a new 3,000 seat stadium, alongside community facilities for the surrounding area. Following public consultation and an appeal over the decision to grant Planning Permission, construction began in January 2021 and is scheduled to open in late 2023.

Current squad

Honours
Southern League
Winners: 1962–63
Southern League Southern Division
Winners: 1985–86
Southern League Cup
Winners: 2009–10
FA Cup
Second Round: 2004–05
FA Trophy
Fifth Round: 2004-05,2005-06
FA Amateur Cup
Semi-final: 1927–28
Cambridgeshire Invitation Cup
 Winners (15): 1950–51, 1976–77, 1978–79, 1983–84, 1985–86, 1988–89, 1989-90, 1992–93,   1999–00, 2002-03, 2006–07, 2007-08, 2008-09, 2014–15, 2016–17
Cambridgeshire Professional Cup
Winners: 2007-08, 2010-11, 2011–12, 2016–17
Supporters Direct Cup
Joint winners: 2007
Challenge International du Nord
Winners: 1912

Records 
Record attendance: 12,058 vs Leytonstone, FA Amateur Cup first round, 1949–50
Record transfer fee received: £100,000 from Millwall for Neil Harris, 1998
Record transfer fee paid: £8,000 to Rushden & Diamonds for Paul Coe, 1994

Reserve team
Cambridge City's reserve team joined the Eastern Counties League in 1959 and won the Division One title in 2004. They were replaced in the league in 2006 by the newly formed feeder club Cambridge Regional College. A reformed Cambridge City reserve side was born playing at Milton Road, and won promotion as champions from the Kershaw Senior A League in the 2012/2013 season.  After a period of uncertainty about the future home of the reserves after moving from Milton Road, a deal was announced with local side Cottenham to use their facilities.

1959–60   Joined Eastern Counties League
1961–62   Runners-up
1963–64   Joined Metropolitan League
1965–66   Rejoined Eastern Counties League
1966      Left Eastern Counties League
1973–74   Rejoined Eastern Counties League
1976      Left Eastern Counties League
1991–92   Rejoined Eastern Counties League, in Division One
1995      Left Eastern Counties League
1996–97   Rejoined Eastern Counties League
1998      Left Eastern Counties League
1999–2000   Rejoined Eastern Counties League
2003–04   Eastern Counties League Division One Champions; Promoted to Premier Division
2012–13   Kershaw Senior A League Champions; Promoted to Kershaw Premier Division
Best league position: 2nd in Eastern Counties League, 1961–62

See also
 List of Cambridge City F.C. seasons

Sources

References

External links

Official site
Cambridge City Supporters Trust website

 
Football clubs in England
National League (English football) clubs
Sport in Cambridge
Association football clubs established in 1908
Southern Football League clubs
Athenian League
1908 establishments in England
Football clubs in Cambridgeshire
Southern Amateur Football League
St. Edmundsbury Football League
East Anglian League
Spartan League
Isthmian League
Northern Premier League clubs